Aspidothelium lueckingii is a species of corticolous (bark-dwelling) in the family Thelenellaceae. Found in mountainous cloud forests in Bolivia, it was formally described in 2009 by lichenologist Adam Flakus. It is known only from the type locality. It is named in honour of German lichenologist Robert Lücking, "for his magnificent contribution to the knowledge of tropical lichens."

Description

Characteristics of the lichen include the its pale  with seta-like appendages and large, regularly  ascospores. Aspidothelium lueckingii has a thin and smooth, green to greyish-green thallus with an irregular shape and an translucent, indistinct . It has a  photobiont partner, with green cells measuring 6–14 µm in diameter.

References

Lecanoromycetes
Lichen species
Lichens described in 2009
Lichens of Bolivia
Taxa named by Adam Grzegorz Flakus